Casey Eure (born March 1, 1978) is an American politician and former law enforcement officer, currently serving as a member of the Mississippi House of Representatives, where he represents the 116th district.

Education 
Eure attended Mississippi Gulf Coast Community College and the University of Southern Mississippi Law Enforcement Academy.

Career 
Prior to entering politics, Eure worked for the Harrison County Sheriff's Department.

A Republican, he is a member of the Mississippi House of Representatives, first elected in a special election in 2011 to fill Steven Palazzo's seat, who was elected to the United States House of Representatives.

Personal life 
Eure is married to Jill (née Gary), with whom he has two children. He is Catholic.

References

1978 births
Living people
Politicians from Jackson, Mississippi
Republican Party members of the Mississippi House of Representatives
21st-century American politicians
University of Southern Mississippi alumni
Mississippi Gulf Coast Community College alumni